Casado is a Spanish surname. People with this name include:

 Alberto Casado Cerviño (born 1952), Director General of the Spanish Patent and Trademark Office
 Antonio Casado Ruiz (born 1961), Spanish footballer
 Arturo Casado (born 1983), Spanish middle-distance runner
 Carlos Casado del Alisal (1833–99), Spanish Argentine businessman
 Coral Casado Ortiz (born 1996), Spanish professional racing cyclist
 Desiree Casado (born 1985), actress known for the role of Gabriela Rodriguez on Sesame Street
 Elizabeth Casado (born 1965), Puerto Rican politician
 Gloria Casado (born 1963), Spanish swimmer
 Israel Casado, Dominican arranger, music coordinator, piano player, musical director, and producer
 Iván Casado Ortiz (born 1993), Spanish footballer
 John Casado (born 1944), American graphic designer, artist and photographer
 Jorge Casado (born 1989), Spanish professional footballer 
 José Casado (born 1988), Spanish footballer
 José Casado del Alisal (–86), Spanish portrait and history painter
 José Manuel Casado (born 1986), Spanish professional footballer 
 Juan Casado (born 1980), Argentine footballer
 Pablo Casado (born in 1981), Spanish politician and leader of the People's Party
 Pedro Casado (1937–2021), Spanish footballer
 Philippe Casado (1964–1995), French professional road bicycle racer
 Segismundo Casado (1893–1968), Spanish Army officer

See also
 Casados, related surname